Greinke may refer to:
 Jeff Greinke, American ambient music and jazz artist
 Zack Greinke, Major League Baseball pitcher